The Chieti Museum of Biomedical Sciences is a medical museum, located in Chieti, Abruzzo. It was established in 1994 at Palazzo De Pasquale, promoted by Luigi Capasso. D'Annunzio University assumed governance of the Museum in 2010.

It is dedicated to the knowledge and dissemination of Natural Sciences and History of Science, focusing on biological and medical aspects arising from research in archaeology, medicine, anthropology and palaeontology. In 2005, the Museum of Biomedical Sciences moved to Palazzo Arnaldo Mussolini in the historic centre of Chieti.

It currently hosts a collections of over 19,000 records in the fields of palaeontology, prehistory, anthropology, botany and zoology. In addition, it includes scientific instruments as well as works of modern art. The Museum of Biomedical Sciences is a member of the International Council of Museums.

References

External links

 

1994 establishments in Italy
Chieti
Medical museums
Museums established in 1994
Museums in Abruzzo
Science museums in Italy
University museums
D'Annunzio University of Chieti–Pescara
Medical and health organisations based in Italy